Friedrich Karl Freiherr von Tettenborn (19 February 1778, in County of Sponheim – 9 December 1845, in Vienna) was a famous cavalry commander in the Austrian and Russian armies during the Napoleonic Wars.

Life

Tettenborn first studied at the Waltershausen Forstwissenschaft and then at the Universities of Göttingen and Jena. In 1794 he joined the Austrian military and quickly rose to captain during the French Revolutionary Wars and Napoleonic Wars.  In the Austro-French war he was in 1805 in the army under Mack, which dispersed after raising the siege of Ulm. At the battle of Wagram (1809), he rose to the rank of major. After the Treaty of Schönbrunn he accompanied prince Schwarzenberg to Paris.

At the outbreak of the Russian war of 1812, he entered the Russian army as a lieutenant colonel. At the head of Kutuzov's vanguard, he was again the first to engage at Moscow, pursuing the French as far as the Beresina at the head of the light cavalry, raising the siege of Vilnius, going beyond the Neman River, chasing MacDonald through East Prussia and occupying Königsberg.

Appointed oberst, he crossed the Vistula and Oder, joined up with general Tschernischew in Landsberg and then moved on Berlin. From there, he was dispatched to Hamburg, occupying it on 18 March 1813 after throwing back Morand at Bergedorf on the left bank of the Elbufer. Yet he had to leave the city to the advancing Davout on 30 May. His actions in Hamburg are judged critically. Fahl writes of von Tettenborn at this era "he observed Hamburg as a favourable location to enrich itself and to lead a straying life. He strove less for an earnest defence of the city than for collecting of an honorary award of 5,000 Friedriches d'or and for his appointment as an honorary citizen he was also the first honorary citizen of Hamburg."

He then fought under Wallmoden against Davout and against Pécheux, after whose defeat he took Bremen on 15 October.  In January 1814 he was delegated to use a single corps of light cavalry to maintain communications between the many separate Allied armies operating in France.

After the peace, he withdrew to his estates, and in 1818 he left the service of Russia to join that of Baden. In 1819 he went to Vienna as an envoy, where he died on 9 December 1845.

References

Bibliography
Karl August Varnhagen von Ense: Geschichte der Kriegszüge des Generals Tettenborn, Stuttgart 1814

1778 births
1845 deaths
Recipients of the Order of St. George of the Third Degree
University of Göttingen alumni
University of Jena alumni
Military leaders of the French Revolutionary Wars
Russian commanders of the Napoleonic Wars
Knights of the Military Order of Max Joseph
German commanders of the Napoleonic Wars